Bjørnafjorden is a fjord in Vestland county, Norway. It runs through the municipalities of Austevoll, Bjørnafjorden, and Tysnes. The large island of Tysnesøya (and many small, surrounding islands such as Reksteren) lie along the south side of the Bjørnafjorden and the Bergen Peninsula and the mainland lie along the north and east sides of the fjord. The Fusafjorden (and the Samnangerfjorden which branches off it) split off from the main fjord on the north side by the village of Osøyro.

The municipality of Bjørnafjorden, which was established on 1 January 2020 as a merger between the old municipalities of Os and Fusa, is named after the fjord.

See also
 List of Norwegian fjords

References

 
Geography of Vestland
Fjords of Vestland
Tysnes
Austevoll